Wrestling in Australia may refer to:

Professional wrestling in Australia
Amateur wrestling in Australia
Wrestling Australia, the organization governing freestyle wrestling and Greco-Roman wrestling in Australia.